Joseph Nathan Kane (January 23, 1899 – September 22, 2002) was an American non-fiction writer.

Works

Kane wrote a total of 52 books, some of which are these below.
	
 Famous First Facts (1933) H. W. Wilson (New York, NY), Fifth revised edition (1997).
 More First Facts (1935) H. W. Wilson (New York, NY).	
 What Dog Is That? (1942) Greenberg (New York, NY).
 Centennial History of King Solomon Lodge, Number 279, Free and Accepted Masons, 1852-1952, King Solomon Lodge, Number 279 F & A.M. (1952) (New York, NY).
 The Perma Quiz Book, (1956) Permabooks (New York, NY).
 The Second Perma Quiz Book, (1958) Permabooks (New York, NY).
 American Counties: Record of Names of 3,067 counties (1960) Scarecrow Press (New York, NY).
 Nicknames of Cities and States of the United States, Scarecrow Press (1965) (w/ Gerard L. Alexander) New York, NY.
 Nicknames and Sobriquets of United States Cities, States, and Counties (1979).
 American Counties: Origins of County Names, Including 1980 Census Figures, Historical Data, and Published Sources (1983).
 Necessity's Child: Story of Walter Hunt (1997).
 Presidential Fact Book, (1998) Random House (New York, NY).
 Facts about the Presidents: A Compilation of Biographical and Historical Data, (1959), H. W. Wilson Company (New York, NY), Seventh revised edition (2001).

References

Bibliography

American centenarians
Men centenarians
1899 births
2002 deaths
Jewish American journalists
20th-century American non-fiction writers
20th-century American Jews
21st-century American Jews